Regnault de Chartres ( in Ons-en-Bray - 4 April 1444 in Tours) was a French cardinal, archbishop of Rheims, peer of France (as Archbishop-Duke of Rheims) and chancellor of France during the reign of King Charles VII of France. In 1429 during the Hundred Years' War he anointed and crowned the dauphin Charles king of France in Rheims, thus upholding the Valois dynasty's claim to the French throne against the English claim of King Henry VI of England.

Early life
Regnault de Chartres was born from the second marriage of his father, Hector de Chartres , Lord of Lyons-en-Beauvaisis, Ons-en-Bray ((beheaded in Paris in 1418) with Blanche de Clermont-Nesle).

Regnault had three brothers: Pierre de Chartres, the elder one, and Hector de Chartres the Younger (killed in 1415 at Agincourt with his two lay brothers). It is possible, but not certain, that these de Chartres belong to the notable house of the vidames de Chartres (it is generally accepted that Regnault was related to the family of Beauvilliers; but the arms of the latter are very similar to those of the vidames, bearing bands and merlettes), and / or to the Chartres family of Ver-lès-Chartres from the 12th-13th centuries.

During the reign of Charles VI 
He was a canon in the chapter of the Beauvais Cathedral and was elected its dean in 1404. Subsequently, he served as chamberlain and referendary of antipope John XXIII and presided over the Paris Court of Accounts. He was appointed to the archbishopric of Rheims on 2 January 1414 but he did not take office until 16 July 1429, the day before the coronation of Charles VII. In 1415 he attended the Council of Constance.

On 16 August 1418 he was named lieutenant du roi and adviser to the Dauphin, in the provinces of Languedoc, Lyonnais and Mâconnais.

During the reign of Charles VII 
On 28 March 1424 he became chancellor, succeeding Martin Gouge for several months until the latter was reinstated.  He was again appointed chancellor of France on 8 November 1428. He participated in the war councils in Orleans.

The king sold him the city of Vierzon on 7 August 1425.

On 17 July 1429 he consecrated Charles VII in Rheims, in the presence of Joan of Arc. On 10 October, on safe conduct, he left for Saint-Denis to negotiate with the English represented by the bishop of Thérouanne, Lewis of Luxembourg, counselor of Henry VI of England.

On 26 July 1432 he received 600 mouton d’or from the king for negotiating a peace treaty in Auxerre. He was appointed to the Archbishopric of Embrun by Pope Eugene IV in 1434, but preferred to stay in Rheims.

On 6 July 1435 he was in Arras to negotiate a treaty with the Duke of Burgundy, Philip the Good, then in Calais to reduce the tensions between France and England.

On 4 April 1436 he was named administrator of the bishopric of Agde, and officiated at the wedding of the Dauphin Louis to Margaret of Scotland, on June 24 in Tours.

Pope Eugene IV appointed him to the bishopric of Orléans in commendam on 17 March 1439. He took possession of it on 25 October, and officiated at the wedding of Charles, Duke of Orléans and Mary of Cleves in 1440 in Saint-Omer. In recognition of his services, the king obtained for him the position of cardinal: he was named cardinal at the General Council held in Florence on 18 December 1439, and took over the titular church of Santo Stefano al Monte Celio on 8 January 1440.

Death
He was given the bishopric of Mende in 1444 when, after mid-Lent, he went to Tours to see Charles VII and conduct peace negotiations with England. As he was going to speak to the king, he was taken with an illness and died suddenly on 4 April 1444. He was buried in the (now destroyed) Fransciscan church.

After his death his archbishopric remained vacant for almost seven months.

The arms of Regnault de Chartres are emblazoned as follows: Argent, a two fess gules.

References 

Archbishops of Reims
Bishops of Agde
Bishops of Orléans
15th-century French cardinals
Chancellors of France
People of the Hundred Years' War
People from Île-de-France
1444 deaths